Kerstin Gressmann (born 17 January 1994 in Swakopmund) is a Namibian tennis player.

Playing for Namibia at the Fed Cup, Gressmann has a win-loss record of 4-6.

Gressmann began playing tennis at age 8. In 2007, she relocated to Stellenbosch, South Africa, where she trained at the Kainos Tennis Academy and attended Stellenbosch High School. Following graduation, she left South Africa to further develop her game at the Barcelona Tennis Academy in Spain.

Gressmann is fluent in English, German, and Afrikaans.

Fed Cup participation

Singles

Doubles

References

External links 
 
 
 

1994 births
Living people
Namibian people of German descent
White Namibian people
Namibian expatriate sportspeople in Spain
Namibian expatriate sportspeople in South Africa
Namibian female tennis players
Sportspeople from Swakopmund
Expatriate sportspeople in South Africa